Hans Schack, Count of Schackenborg (4 March 1676 – 22 September 1719) was a Danish nobleman and enfeoffed count. He was the second holder of the County of Schackenborg from 1683 to 1719.

Biography 
Hans Schack was born on 4 March 1676 in Ribe in the Kingdom of Denmark. Born into the noble family of Schack, he was the second child and eldest surviving son of the Danish nobleman and civil servant Otto Didrik Schack, and his second wife Sophie Dorothea von Marschalk.

At the death of his grandfather in February 1676, his father had inherited the large manors of Schackenborg and Gram in Southern Jutland, and Gisselfeld in Zealand. Later in the same year, on 23 June 1676, Otto Didrik Schack was awarded the title of enfeoffed count, as the County of Schackenborg was created from the manors of Schackenborg, Sødamgård, Solvig, and Store Tønde.

At the death of his father on 1 July 1683, he inherited the County of Schackenborg and assumed the title of enfeoffed count. From 1692 he was educated at the knight academy in Copenhagen that prepared aristocratic youth for state and military service, and in 1695, he was made a chamberlain at the Danish court. On 19 October 1697, he was appointed amtmann of the Amt of Riberhus, and on 15 August the following year, he was awarded the Order of the Dannebrog.

In 1702, he entered into French military service. As such he participated in the Battle of Blenheim in 1704 during the War of the Spanish Succession. On 22 July 1712, he was made a Geheimrat in the privy council. On 26 October 1716 he was awarded the Order of the Elephant.

Count Schack died already on 22 September 1719, aged only 43, in Copenhagen in the Kingdom of Denmark. He was succeeded by his eldest surviving son, Otto Didrik Schack.

Family
Schack married firstly on 16 March 1699 in the chapel of Christiansborg Palace Countess Anne Margrethe Reventlow, daughter of Grand Chancellor Count Conrad von Reventlow and Sophie Amalie von Hahn, by whom he had four children. She died on 21 March 1710.
 Count Frederik August Schack (1707–1707)
 Baroness Louise Schack (1707–1707)
 Count Conrad Schack (1708–1709)
 Otto Didrik Schack, who succeeded him as 3rd Count of Schackenborg.

Schack married secondly in 1711 in Hamburg Anna Sophie Rantzau, daughter of Christian von Rantzau and Margrethe Rantzau, by whom he had one child:
 Baroness Anne Margrethe Schack (1713–1720)

Notes and references

Bibliography

External links 
 Official website of Schackenborg Castle

1676 births
1719 deaths
17th-century Danish people
18th-century Danish people
People from Tønder Municipality
People from Ribe
Knights of the Order of the Dannebrog
Counts of Denmark